Alexandre Ryder (1891–1966) was a Polish-born French film director best known for his crime drama films of the 1920s and 1930s.

He directed some 20 films between 1920 and 1950.

His 1940 film Après Mein Kampf mes crimes (My Crimes after Mein Kampf) was a propaganda film directed against Nazi Germany and Adolf Hitler's policies. Germany had invaded Poland, Ryder's homeland, a year earlier in 1939.

Selected filmography
 The Woman with Closed Eyes (1926)
 The Criminal (1926)
 Buridan's Donkey (1932)
 Mirages (1938)

External links 

Polish film directors
French film directors
Silent film directors
French male screenwriters
20th-century French screenwriters
French people of Polish descent
1891 births
1966 deaths
People from Będzin
20th-century French male writers
Austro-Hungarian emigrants to France